This is a list of zoos and aquariums that are member of World Association of Zoos and Aquariums (WAZA).

The WAZA has two types/levels of membership.
The first is an association member that is through another zoo association such as the Association of Zoos and Aquariums (AZA).
The second is a direct institutional membership of WAZA.

See also 
 List of zoo associations

References 
 World Association of Zoos and Aquariums members page

WAZA